Sarona is an unincorporated community located in the town of Sarona, Washburn County, Wisconsin, United States. Sarona has a post office with ZIP code 54870.

History
Sarona was founded in 1898. It was named by combining the last name of Fran Sauer (the first settler in 1898) with the Sharon plain, which the lush grass of the area suggested to the Mennonites who came the next year. A post office has been in operation in Sarona since 1899.

References

Unincorporated communities in Washburn County, Wisconsin
Unincorporated communities in Wisconsin